The Peninsula Princess is a single ended roll-on/roll-off vehicle ferry owned by Peninsula Searoad Transport of Victoria, Australia. It operated between the heads of Port Phillip Bay between the towns of Queenscliff and Sorrento from 1987 to 1993. It was replaced by the MV Queenscliff.

In 2004 the ferry was sighted docked in the Tamar River in Launceston, Tasmania. In July 2008 the Peninsula Princess was brought back into service on the Queenscliff – Sorrento route, when one of the larger ferries was in dry dock.

In 2009 the ferry temporarily operated the Bruny Island Ferry route, replacing the Mirambeena while it underwent maintenance.

The ferry has operated the Queenscliff - Sorrento route when the MV Queenscliff underwent a refit and maintenance in mid-2011  and again in July and August 2013. The ferry was re intoduced into service in December 2022 while the MV Queenscliff suffered mechanical problems which was sent to Geelong for engineering for an unknown duration.

In Popular Culture
The Peninsula Pricess was featured in the popular children's TV program Round The Twist, in the season 2 episode 'Pink Bow Tie', first broadcast in 1992.

References

External links
Peninsula Searoad Ferry

Ferries of Victoria (Australia)
Transport in Geelong
Transport in Victoria (Australia)
1987 ships
Port Phillip